The women's javelin throw at the 1958 European Athletics Championships was held in Stockholm, Sweden, at Stockholms Olympiastadion on 19 August 1958.

Medalists

Results

Final
19 August

Qualification
19 August

Participation
According to an unofficial count, 16 athletes from 10 countries participated in the event.

 (1)
 (1)
 (1)
 (3)
 (1)
 (3)
 (1)
 (1)
 (3)
 (1)

References

Javelin throw
Javelin throw at the European Athletics Championships
Euro